Castellví de Rosanes is a municipality in the comarca of the Baix Llobregat 
in the province of Barcelona, Catalonia, Spain. , the municipality had 1,807 inhabitants and was 16.4 km2, which includes the neighbourhoods of Els Àngels, Can Sunyer del Palau, Miralles, El Taió and Valldaina. Castellví de Rosanes is located between Martorell and Gelida, which ones are bigger cities both connected with Renfe.

References

External links 
 Government data pages 

Municipalities in Baix Llobregat